Ahoban! is the 4th solo album by Bangladeshi composer and musician Habib Wahid, and his 8th studio album overall. It was released on June 1, 2011. Sajid Sarker co-produced the album alongside Habib Wahid. The album was released exclusively by Banglalink.

Production 
Like his other albums, the music of Ahoban! was composed and produced by Habib Wahid. However, mixing and mastering was done by Sajid Sarker, who co-produced the album. The Daily Star described the album as a "big budget" album.

Release 
The album was released exclusively by Banglalink through the label Deadline Music. Amadergaan.com was given exclusive rights to distribute the song online.

Reception 
The album not only was a commercial success, but also gained immense popularity among audiences, The Daily Star reported in their 2011 recap of Bangladeshi music.

Track listing

References

2011 albums
Habib Wahid albums